The TOM-8 was a prototype Czechoslovak single-engined two-seat training aircraft of the 1950s. It was designed by the VZLU, the Czechoslovak national aeronautic research institute for the Czechoslovak Air Force, with a prototype flying in 1956, but production plans were abandoned in 1960.

Design and development
In the mid-1950s, the Czechoslovak Air Force had a requirement to replace its Aero C-11 trainers, a licence-built version of the Soviet Yakovlev Yak-11. The design of the new aircraft was allocated to a team at the VZLU,, led by Karel Tomáš, who had previously served as chief designer for Tatra's aviation department, and later for Zlín, where he designed the Zlín Z 26 trainer.

The resulting design, designated TOM-8 after Tomáš, and also known as the L-8, was a low-winged monoplane of all metal construction, powered by a single  Praga Doris C air-cooled six-cylinder horizontally-opposed piston engine. Student and instructor sat in tandem in an enclosed cockpit, with the student in the front seat, and were provided with dual controls. The aircraft had a retractable tricycle landing gear.

The first TOM-8 made its maiden flight on 23 April 1956, but development was slowed by engine problems, and plans for production at the Moravan Otrokovice works (where Zlín aircraft were built) were abandoned in 1960.

One TOM-8 is preserved at the Kbely Aviation Museum.

Specifications

Notes

References

1950s Czechoslovakian military trainer aircraft
Aircraft first flown in 1956